Hyers is an unincorporated community in Braxton County, in the U.S. state of West Virginia.

History
A post office called Hyer was established in 1891, and remained in operation until 1956. The community was named after J. S. Hyer.

References

Unincorporated communities in Braxton County, West Virginia
Unincorporated communities in West Virginia